A. I. Neusykhin (1898 - 1969) was a Soviet historian and medievalist, Doctor of Sciences in Historical Sciences (1946), Professor at the Lomonosov Moscow State University. He headed the department of history at the Tomsk State Pedagogical University.

Neusykhin graduated from Moscow State University (MSU) in 1921.
He was a student of Dmitry Petrushevsky.
Neusykhin published his first article in 1922.

In 1938, he received the title of Professor. In 1946, he defended his doctoral dissertation.

From 1942 to 1943, Neusykhin headed the Department of History of the Middle Ages at the MSU. 

His student was Aron Gurevich.

Awards and honours
He was awarded Order of the Red Banner of Labour (1954).
 Medal "For Valiant Labour in the Great Patriotic War 1941–1945" (1946)
 Medal "In Commemoration of the 800th Anniversary of Moscow" (1948)

References

1898 births
1969 deaths
Soviet historians
Soviet professors
Moscow State University alumni
Professors of the Moscow State University
Recipients of the Order of the Red Banner of Labour